This is a list of records and statistics of Burgos CF since its re-foundation in 1994.

Honours

National titles
Copa Federación: (1) 1996–97
Segunda División B group champion: (1) 2000–01 Group 2
Tercera División Group VIII: (4) 1996–97, 2009–10, 2010–11, 2012–13

Regional titles
Copa Federación (Castile and León tournament): (2) 1996–97, 2012–13

Team statistics

In Segunda División
Seasons: 1
Position in All-time Segunda División table: 129th

Records
Highest final position: 16th (2001–02)
Most points in a season: 52 (2001–02)
Most consecutive seasons in Segunda División: 1 (2001–02)
Record home win: 3–1 vs Xerez (2001–02, round 6, 30 September 2001) and 2–0 vs Polideportivo Ejido (2001–02, round 22, 13 January 2002)
Record away win: 1–5 at Numancia (2001–02, round 16, 25 November 2001)
Record home loss: 0–4 vs Atlético Madrid (2001–02, round 21, 6 January 2002)
Record away loss: 3–0 at Racing Ferrol (2001–02, round 30, 3 March 2002)

Games
First game: 0–1 at Polideportivo Ejido (2001–02, round 1, 25 August 2001)
Last game: 1–1 at Atlético Madrid (2001–02, round 42, 25 May 2002)

Goals
First goal: José Mari (0–1 at Polideportivo Ejido, 2001–02, round 1, 25 August 2001)
Last goal: Ángel Merino (1–1 at Atlético Madrid, 2001–02, round 42, 25 May 2002)
Youngest goalscorer: Galder Zubizarreta at 21 years and 321 days (1–1 at Córdoba, 2001–02, round 18, 8 December 2001)
Oldest goalscorer: Ángel Merino at 35 years and 235 days (1–1 at Atlético Madrid, 2001–02, round 42, 25 May 2002)

Streaks
Winning: 3 (2001–02, round 4 to 6)
Winning at home: 3 (2001–02, round 2 to 6)
Winning away: 3 (2001–02, round 12 to 16)
Unbeaten: 7 (2001–02, round 31 to 37)
Unbeaten at home: 8 (2001–02, round 22 to 37)
Unbeaten away: 7 (2001–02, round 10 to 23)
Scoring: 3 (2001–02, round 4 to 6 and 12 to 14)
Scoring at home: 2 (2001–02, three times)
Scoring away: 4 (2001–02, round 14 to 20)
Without goals against: 5 (2001–02, round 31 to 35)
Without goals against at home: 5 (2001–02, round 26 to 35)
Without goals against away: 3 (2001–02, round 10 to 14)
Draws streak: 3 (2001–02, round 17 to 19 and 31 to 33)
Draws streak at home: 7 (2001–02, round 24 to 37)
Draws streak away: 1 (six times)
Games without winning: 11 (2001–02, round 23 to 33)
Games without winning at home: 9 (2001–02, round 24 to 41)
Games without winning away: 6 (2001–02, round 23 to 34)
Losing: 4 (2001–02, round 38 to 41)
Losing at home: 4 (2001–02, round 9 to 15)
Losing away: 2 (2001–02, round 25 to 27 and 38 to 40)
Without scoring: 9 (2001–02, round 25 to 33)
Without scoring at home: 5 (2001–02, round 26 to 35)
Without scoring away: 5 (2001–02, round 25 to 32)
With goals against: 7 (2001–02, round 36 to 42)
With goals against at home: 4 (2001–02, round 9 to 15)
With goals against away: 4 (2001–02, round 36 to 42)

In Segunda División B

Seasons: 14

Records
Highest final position: 1st (2000–01)
Lowest final position: 20th (2011–12)
Most points in a season: 72 (2000–01)
Fewest points in a season: 28 (2011–12)
Most consecutive seasons in Segunda División B: 6 (2002–03 to 2007–08)
Fewest consecutive seasons in Segunda División B: 1 (2011–12)
Record home win: 7–0 vs Gernika (2000–01, round 30, 18 March 2001)
Record away win: 1–5 at Conquense (1999–2000, round 19, 5 January 2000) and 0–4 at Peña Sport (2000–01, round 7, 12 October 2000) and at Universidad Oviedo (2006–07, round 37, 20 May 2007)
Record home loss: 1–5 vs Conquense (2003–04, round 28, 7 March 2004) 
Record away loss: 4–0 at Real Madrid B (2003–04, round 4, 14 September 2003) and at Ponferradina (2011–12, round 9, 16 October 2011)

Games
First game: 1–0 at Cultural Leonesa (1997–98, round 1, 31 August 1997)
500th game: 0–0 at Lealtad (2015–16, round 8, 10 October 2015)
Last game: 1–1 at Pontevedra (2015–16, round 38, 15 May 2016)

Goals
First goal: José Antonio Catón (2–0 vs Lemona, 1996–97, round 2, 7 September 1997)
500th goal: Joaqui (2–2 at Sporting Gijón B, 2013–14, round 19, 21 December 2013)
Last goal: Adrián (1–1 at Pontevedra, 2015–16, round 38, 15 May 2016)

In Tercera División
Seasons: 5

Records
Highest final position: 1st (four times)
Lowest final position: 3rd (2008–09)
Most points in a season: 90 (2009–10 and 2012–13)
Fewest points in a season: 81 (2008–09)
Most consecutive seasons in Tercera División: 3 (2008–09 to 2010–11)
Fewest consecutive seasons in Tercera División: 1 (1996–97 and 2012–13)
Record home win: 7–1 vs Almazán (1996–97, round 28, 9 March 1997) and 6–0 vs Aguilar (2010–11, round 15, 5 December 2010)
Record away win: 1–6 at Cebrereña (2008–09, round 4, 21 September 2008) and at Villaralbo (2012–13, round 16, 2 December 2012)
Record home loss: 0–2 vs Palencia (1996–97, round 8, 20 October 1996) and 1–3 vs Gimnástica Segoviana (2010–11, round 30, 20 March 2011)
Record away loss: 3–0 at Valladolid B (2009–10, round 2, 6 September 2009)

Games
First game: 0–2 at Gimnástica Segoviana (1996–97, round 1, 1 September 1996)
Last game: 4–0 vs Salamanca B (2012–13, round 38, 19 May 2013)

In Copa del Rey

Editions: 13

Records
Furthest round: Round of 32 (2007–08)
Record home win: 3–1 and 2–0 (four times)
Record away win: 0–3 at Tuilla (2013–14, round 2, 11 September 2003)
Record home loss: 0–2 and 1–3 (four times) 
Record away loss: 4–1 at Getafe (2007–08, round of 32, 2 January 2008)

Games
First game: 1–0 vs Logroñés (1996–97, round 1, 3 September 1997)
Last game: 2–1 at Caudal (2016–17, round 2, 31 August 2016)

References

External links
List of games at AupaBurgos.com
Statistics and games at BDFutbol.com

Burgos CF
Spanish football club statistics
Records